The 1980 United States presidential election in Colorado took place on November 4, 1980. All 50 states and The District of Columbia, were part of the 1980 United States presidential election. State voters chose seven electors to the Electoral College, who voted for president and vice president.

Colorado was won by the Republican Party candidate, former California Governor Ronald Reagan by a landslide of  24 points, defeating Democratic incumbent president Jimmy Carter. John B. Anderson, an Illinois Republican congressman running on the National Unity ticket, received 11% of the vote.

, this is the last occasion where a Republican candidate carried the City and County of Denver. Since then, Denver has remained a reliable Democratic stronghold in presidential elections, which would eventually cause the state to flip consistently Democratic from 2008 onward.

Results

Results by county

References

Colorado
1980
1980 Colorado elections